Odites semibrunnea is a moth in the family Depressariidae. It was described by John David Bradley in 1958 and is found in Kenya.

The larvae feed on Coffea arabica.

References

Moths described in 1958
Odites
Taxa named by Edward Meyrick
Endemic moths of Kenya